El Cocal Airport  is an airstrip in the pampa of the Beni Department in Bolivia.

See also

Transport in Bolivia
List of airports in Bolivia

References

External links 
OpenStreetMap - El Cocal
OurAirports - El Cocal
Fallingrain - El Cocal Airport
Bing Maps - El Cocal

Airports in Beni Department